The 1996–97 Liga Indonesia Premier Division (known as the Liga Kansas for sponsorship reasons) was the third season of the Liga Indonesia Premier Division, the top division of Indonesian football. The season began on 17 November 1996 and ended on 28 July 1997. Persebaya won the title after beating the defending champions, Bandung Raya 3–1 in the final.

Teams

Team changes
The number of teams increased from 31 to 33 this season.

Relegated to First Division 

 BPD Jateng
 Persegres

Promoted to Premier Division 

 Persedikab
PSB
PSBL
 PSP

Name changes 
 Mataram Putra changed their name to Mataram Indocement.

Stadiums and locations

First stage

West Division

Central Division

East Division

Second stage

Group A

Group B

Group C

Ranking of second-placed teams

</onlyinclude>

Knockout stage

Semifinals

Final

Awards

Top scorers
The following is a list of the top scorers from the 1996-97 season.

Best player
 Nur'alim (Bandung Raya)

References

External links
Indonesia - List of final tables (RSSSF)

Indonesian Premier Division seasons
1996–97 in Indonesian football
Indonesia
Top level Indonesian football league seasons